Praia da Oura is a blue flag beach within the Municipality of Albufeira, in the Algarve, Portugal. The beach is in the eastern district of Albufeira in the neighbourhood called Areias de São João (Saint John's Sands). Its flanked by Praia dos Aveiros to the west and Praia de Santa Eulália to the eastern side.

Description 
The beach is in a small bay and has fine gold sand and some rock formations. The central section is very popular in the summer but the eastern end of the beach, also known as the Praia dos Bicos, is quieter and has less facilities. The rear cliffs at the eastern end feature some jagged rock formations called the Pedra dos Bicos  and are topped with pine woodland with small meadows. The central and western end of the beach are dominated by several large beach resort developments and with a short promenade   which runs across the back of this section of beach.

Facilities  
Parking close to the beach is limited and may prove difficult during the busy summer season. During the summer months the beach is patrolled by lifeguards. There are several licensed bar, restaurant  concessions along the beach. there are toilet and shower facilities and there are opportunities to hire parasols and sun loungers.

Commercial area
Praia da Oura has a commercial area to the rear of the middle of the beach in the Rua Ramalho Ortigao. The shops and business consist of beach shops, supermarket, popular bar cafes, restaurants, and hotels, many of which have views of the beach. There is also a public telephone.

Gallery

Neighbouring Beach locations

References

Beaches of Albufeira
Blue Flag beaches of Portugal